The Treaty of Shaoxing was the agreement that ended the military conflicts between the Jin dynasty and the Southern Song dynasty. It also legally drew up the boundaries of the two countries and forced the Song dynasty to renounce all claims to its former (Northern Song) territories north of the Qinling Huaihe Line, which included its former capital Kaifeng. Emperor Gaozong of Song executed anti-Jin faction general Yue Fei after the treaty.

The treaty was signed in 1141, and under it the Southern Song agreed to paying tribute of 250,000 taels and 250,000 packs of silk to the Jin every year (until 1164, when Jin launched a war to Southern Song). The treaty was formally ratified on 11 October 1142 when a Jin envoy visited the Song court. The treaty reduced the Southern Song Dynasty into a quasi-tribute state of the Jin dynasty.

See also
 Alliance on the Sea
 History of the Song dynasty
 Jin–Song Wars
 List of treaties
 Timeline of the Jin–Song Wars

References

1141
1141 in Asia
12th century in China
Jin–Song Wars
12th-century treaties
Shaoxing
Boundary treaties